William Cook (October 13, 1928 – June 19, 1981) was an American actor best known for his work as a child.

Cook was born in Menlo Park, New Jersey. His early acting experience came in plays directed by his mother. In films, he played the young version of characters acted by Ray Milland in Men with Wings (1938) and Beau Geste (1939). He died in Kennebunkport, Maine at age 52.

Filmography

References

External links
 

1928 births
1981 deaths
American male film actors
Male actors from New Jersey
20th-century American male actors